Karl Burkhart (10 May 1908 – 1976) was a Swiss cyclist. He competed in the tandem event at the 1936 Summer Olympics.

References

External links
 

1908 births
1976 deaths
Swiss male cyclists
Olympic cyclists of Switzerland
Cyclists at the 1936 Summer Olympics
Place of birth missing